The Effect of Love (Spanish: El resultado del amor) is a 2007 Argentinian drama film, written and directed by Eliseo Subiela, an Argentinian film director. The film was shot in Buenos Aires and San Luis in Argentina.

Plot
Mabel (Sofía Gala) is raped in the chapel of the shantytown where she lives and then she becomes a clown and a prostitute. Martín (Guillermo Pfening) is a lawyer who has recently separated from his wife and left his father's law firm. They meet and eventually fall in love, but soon after Mabel discovers she is a HIV virus carrier.

Awards and nominations
 The Argentine Film Critics Association awarded Sofía Gala a Silver Condor for Best New Actress in 2008.
 Silver Colon for Best Actress in 2007 Festival de Cine Iberoamericano de Huelva.
 Sofía Gala was nominated for a Clarín Award in 2007 for Best New Actress.
 Eliseo Subiela was nominated for Golden Colon in 2007 Festival de Cine Iberoamericano de Huelva.

References

External links
 

2007 films
2007 romantic drama films
Films about prostitution in Argentina
HIV/AIDS in film
Films set in hospitals
Films shot in Buenos Aires
Argentine romantic drama films
2000s Argentine films